This is a list of owners and executives of the Seattle Mariners Major League Baseball club since its inception as an expansion team in .

Owners

General managers

Other executives

Chuck Armstrong
John Boles
Mel Didier
Kevin Mather
Dan O'Brien Jr.
Reggie Waller

See also
List of Seattle Mariners managers

References

External links
Baseball America: Executive Database

 
 
Seattle
Owners and executives